Cathal Ryan is a Gaelic footballer from County Laois.

He usually plays at full back for Laois and in 2003 was part of the Laois team that won the All-Ireland Minor Football Championship title for the first time since 1997.
The following year he made his senior inter-county championship debut in an ill-fated qualifier defeat at the hands of Tyrone in Croke Park.
In 2006, Cathal was part of the Laois team that won the Leinster U21 Football Championship.

He also plays for his home town club Portarlington where his position varies from midfield to defence.

References

1985 births
Living people
Laois inter-county Gaelic footballers
Portarlington Gaelic footballers